Mei Lan (22 October 1894 – 8 August 1961), better known by his stage name Mei Lanfang, was a notable Peking opera artist in modern Chinese theater. Mei was known as "Queen of Peking Opera". Mei was exclusively known for his female lead roles (dan) and particularly his "verdant-robed girls" (qingyi), young or middle-aged women of grace and refinement. He was considered one of the "Four Great Dan", along with Shang Xiaoyun,  Cheng Yanqiu, and Xun Huisheng.

Early life 
Mei Lanfang was born in Beijing in 1894 into a family of Peking opera and Kunqu performers (performers of a traditional Chinese theatre composed of drama, ballet, opera, poetry, and music) of Taizhou, Jiangsu ancestry.

Career 
At age 8, Mei Lanfang started training in Chinese opera skills such as acting, singing and acrobatics. Mei Lanfang made his stage debut at the Guanghe Theatre in 1904 when he was 11 years old playing a weaving girl.   In his 50-year stage career, he maintained strong continuity while always working on new techniques. His most famous roles were those of female characters; skillful portrayal of women won him international acclaim, and his smooth, perfectly timed, poised style has come to be known in opera circles as the "Mei School." He also played an important part in continuing the performance tradition of Kunqu, noted particularly for his interpretations of Du Liniang (杜丽娘; in The Peony Pavilion) and Bái Sùzhēn (白素贞; in Legend of the White Snake). Mei's famous portrayal of Beauty Yu was so historically moving that Wenting Song said he was one of the greatest vocal artists in modern China.

Mei was the first artist to spread Beijing Opera to foreign countries, participating in cultural exchanges with Japan, the United States, and other regions. He toured the world, forming friendships with the western contemporaries of his day, including Charlie Chaplin.  In 1930 he toured North America, visiting Hollywood, where he was welcomed by Douglas Fairbanks and Mary Pickford. In 1935, Mei toured Europe, playing to appreciative audiences in Berlin and Moscow. Seeing Mei perform especially impressed the German playwright Bertolt Brecht and influenced his concept of the alienation effect. He served as one of the mentors and guardians of the actress Li Yuru as she began her career.

In July 1937, the Marco Polo Bridge Incident occurred, and the Imperial Japanese Army soon occupied Beijing.  The commander of the Japanese Army ordered Mei to perform for them and appointed Mei to a high rank official position. But Mei refused to sing throughout the duration of the war and endured an impoverished lifestyle until the war ended in 1945.

After 1949 he served as director of China Beijing Opera Theater, director of the Chinese Opera Research Institute, and vice-chairman of China Federation of Literary and Art Circles. Mei joined the Chinese Communist Party in 1959. Besides his autobiography, Forty Years of Life on the Stage, several of his articles and essays have been published in The Collected Works of Mei Lanfang. Recordings of his best-known performances have been published in A Selection of Beijing Operas Performed by Mei Lanfang. In 2000, the story of his life was filmed in a documentary entitled The Worlds of Mei Lanfang.  Acclaimed director Chen Kaige directed Forever Enthralled, a film biography of Mei's life, released in December 2008.

Philanthropy 
In 1924, Mei went to Japan after learning about the Great Kantō earthquake that had caused destruction. During his stay, he not only performed, but he also donated to help the cause.

Personal life 

In the year 1910, Mei married Wang Minghua, and they eventually had one son and one daughter together. While still married to Wang, he married his second wife in 1921, who was also an opera actress. Her name was Fu Zhifang and together, they had nine children. In 1925, he began seeing a third woman, who was also an actress. They lived together unmarried for five years before they broke up.
Mei's daughter Mei Baoyue was a Chinese opera performer. Mei's son Mei Baojiu (1934-2016) was a Chinese opera dan performer.

In popular culture 
Chen Kaige's 2008 film Forever Enthralled is a biographical account of Mei Lanfang.

In 2009 the Chinese Google homepage displayed a logo commemorating his 115th birthday on October 22.

See also
The Qing Ding Pearl

References

Bibliography
 The Editors of Encyclopædia Britannica. "Mei Lanfang." Encyclopædia Britannica Online. Encyclopædia Britannica, 30 Sept. 2014. Web. 06 Mar. 2016.
 Wilson, Charles. "What Is Kunqu Theatre." What Is Kunqu Theatre. Wintergreen Kunqu Society, n.d. Web. 07 Mar. 2016.
 "Traditions - Folk Art." Roles in Peking Opera. Cultural China, n.d. Web. 08 Mar. 2016.
 "梅兰芳." （中国京剧表演艺术家）_百度百科. Baidu, n.d. Web. 09 Mar. 2016.
 .
 Min Tian, Mei Lanfang and the Twentieth-Century International Stage: Chinese Theatre Placed and Displaced (New York: Palgrave, 2012).

External links
 Chen Kaige Plans to Shoot Mei Lanfang Biography
 Forever Enthralled (2008) film on IMDb

1894 births
1961 deaths
Chinese male Peking opera actors
Members of the National Committee of the Chinese People's Political Consultative Conference
Singers from Beijing
Male actors from Beijing
Burials in Beijing
Chinese male silent film actors
Chinese silent film directors
20th-century Chinese  male  singers
20th-century Chinese male actors
Chinese male film actors
Male Kunqu actors
Female impersonators in Peking opera